Juan Carley Vázquez Gómez (born 13 February 2002) is a Cuban athlete who specializes in the shot put. He was the gold medallist at the World Athletics U20 Championships in 2021.

References

External links 

 Juan Carley Vázquez at World Athletics

2002 births
Living people
Cuban male shot putters
World Athletics U20 Championships winners
21st-century Cuban people